Bermudian Landing is a village in the nation of Belize, located near Scotland Halfmoon in Belize District. The name comes from the Bermuda grass planted by the early loggers to feed their oxen, who were used to drag the mahogany to the landing.

References 

Populated places in Belize District
Belize Rural North